Datuk Seri Abdul Halim bin Abdul Samad (Jawi: عبد الحليم بن عبد الصمد) is a Malaysian politician and businessman. He was the former Deputy President of the Dewan Negara from April 2016 to 2 November 2020 when his second 3-year membership term expired. He is also a member of the United Malays National Organisation (UMNO), a party which is aligned with the ruling Perikatan Nasional (PN) coalition and component party of the Barisan Nasional (BN) coalition.

Honours
  :
  Knight Companion of the Order of the Crown of Pahang (DIMP) – Dato' (1996)
  :
  Companion Class I of the Exalted Order of Malacca (DMSM) – Datuk (2004)
  :
  Grand Commander Order of the Territorial Crown (SMW) – Datuk Seri (2012)

References 

1940 births
Living people
Place of birth missing (living people)
Members of the Dewan Negara